Duke of Chevreuse (French Duc de Chevreuse) was a French title of nobility, elevated from the barony of Chevreuse in 1545. Originally created for Jean de Brosse, Duc d'Étampes, it was transferred in 1555 to Charles of Guise, the Cardinal of Lorraine, and became a possession of the House of Guise, becoming the title of the Cardinal's grandnephew, Claude de Guise (1578–1655). It was sold in 1655 to his wife, Marie de Rohan, who transferred it to the son of her first marriage, the Duc de Luynes. It has since been held by the ducs de Luynes.

Dukes of Chevreuse
Jean IV de Brosse (1545–1555)
Charles I (1555–1574)
Charles II (1574–1606)
Claude (1606–1655), elevated to duke-peer in 1612; peerage extinct 1655 upon sale of duchy
Marie de Rohan (1655–1663)
Louis Charles d'Albert (1663)
Charles Honoré d'Albert (1663–1704)
Charles Philippe d'Albert (1704–1735)
Marie Charles Louis d'Albert (1735–1768)
Louis Joseph Charles Amable d'Albert (1768–1807)
Charles Marie Paul André d'Albert (1807–1839)
Honoré Théodore Paul Joseph d'Albert, duc de Luynes (1839–1867)
Charles Honoré Emmanuel d'Albert (1867–1870)
Honoré Charles Marie Sosthène d'Albert (1870–1923)
Philippe d'Albert (1923–1993)
Jean d'Albert, 12th duc de Luynes (1993–2008)
Philippe d'Albert, 13th duc de Luynes (2008–present)

References 

 
House of Albert